Isabella Acres (born February 21, 2001) is an American actress who played Rose on Better Off Ted and Mirabelle Harris in The Kicks.

Early life
Acres was born in Atlanta, Georgia, where she discovered her love for acting in children's theater. She then relocated to Los Angeles. Acres' younger sister, Ava, is also an actress.

Acres is best known for her series regular role as Rose Crisp on Better Off Ted, the seven-year-old daughter of Ted (Jay Harrington) who is often the most mature person at his home and workplace. The show ran for two seasons from 2009 to 2010.

Appearances
Acres also appeared on an episode of Monk in 2007, and single episodes of The Mentalist where she plays Patrick Jane's (Simon Baker) daughter and on the hit television show Hannah Montana. Acres was nominated for Best Performance in a TV Series, Guest Starring Young Actress at the Young Artist Awards 2009 for her performance in The Mentalist.

She had a recurring role of Soleil Friedman in the second season of the Fox television series Touch.

In 2016, she played Mirabelle Harris in the Amazon Studios television series The Kicks.

Filmography

Television

Film

Video games
 Resistance: Burning Skies'' - Rachel

References

External links 
 
 

2001 births
Living people
Actresses from Atlanta
American child actresses
American film actresses
American television actresses
21st-century American actresses